The Order of Parfaite Amitié (literally meaning the 'Order of Perfect Friendship') is a dynastic order of knighthood of the princely House of Thurn and Taxis.

History
The order was founded during the reign of Alexander Ferdinand, 3rd Prince of Thurn and Taxis, as the supreme order of the princely house. Karl Anselm, 4th Prince of Thurn and Taxis, then reformed the order and was able to formally transmit it to descendants to this day. With the abolition of the principalities of the Confederation of the Rhine by the acts of 12 July 1806, the order's value became related to the dynasty, and it is to be given to members who have turned 18 years of age.

Insignia
The order's badge consists of a golden eight-pointed Maltese cross in white enamel. Between the arms of the cross can be seen a tower and an upright lion, the main symbols from the coat of arms of the House of Thurn and Taxis. Upon the arms of the cross are engraved the words VINCULUM AMICITIAE (Latin for 'Chain of Friendship'). In the medallion are the initials  (Carl Anselm). On the reverse, there is a blue-enamelled medallion with the letters  in gold. Since 1928, the initial  (Albert).

Men wear the decoration around their neck with sky-blue band. A copy of the order is in the treasury of the museum at Saint Emmeram's Abbey in Regensburg, Germany.

Recipients 

Albert, 8th Prince of Thurn and Taxis
Albert, 12th Prince of Thurn and Taxis
Alexander, Margrave of Meissen
Carlo Alessandro, 3rd Duke of Castel Duino
Princess Elisabeth of Luxembourg (1901–1950)
Princess Elisabeth of Thurn and Taxis (1860–1881)
Franz Joseph, 9th Prince of Thurn and Taxis
Fritz von Thurn und Taxis
Prince Gabriel of Thurn and Taxis
Gloria, Princess of Thurn and Taxis
Prince Gustav of Thurn and Taxis
Prince Gustav of Thurn and Taxis (1848–1914)
Duchess Helene in Bavaria
Wilhelm Imkamp
Princess Iniga of Thurn and Taxis
Princess Isabel Maria of Braganza
Johannes, 11th Prince of Thurn and Taxis
Karl August, 10th Prince of Thurn and Taxis
Princess Louise of Thurn and Taxis
Prince Ludwig Philipp of Thurn and Taxis
Archduchess Margarethe Klementine of Austria
Maria Emanuel, Margrave of Meissen
Princess Maria Theresia of Thurn and Taxis (born 1980)
Princess Mathilde Sophie of Oettingen-Oettingen and Oettingen-Spielberg
Prince Max Emanuel of Thurn and Taxis (b. 1935)
Prince Max Emanuel of Thurn and Taxis
Maximilian II of Bavaria
Maximilian Anton, Hereditary Prince of Thurn and Taxis
Maximilian Karl, 6th Prince of Thurn and Taxis
Maximilian Maria, 7th Prince of Thurn and Taxis
Prince Paul of Thurn and Taxis
Raimundo, 2nd Duke of Castel Duino
Alexander, Count of Schönburg-Glauchau
Elisabeth von Thurn und Taxis
Baroness Wilhelmine of Dörnberg

References 
 Dr. Kurt Gerhard Klietmann: Ordenskunde – Beiträge zur Geschichte der Auszeichnungen Nr. 1, Verlag Die Ordens-Sammlung, Berlin 1958
 J.B. Mehler: Das fürstliche Haus Thurn und Taxis in Regensburg, Habbel-Verlag, Regensburg 1898

External links

 Brief history of the Order – MedalBook
 Example of the Order's insignia – Dorotheum

Thurn und Taxis
Orders of chivalry awarded to heads of state, consorts and sovereign family members
Dynastic orders